Raorchestes is a genus of frogs in the subfamily Rhacophorinae that are found in mountainous regions of South Asia, Southeast Asia, and southern China. A recent study places Raorchestes as a sister taxon of Pseudophilautus. Before the description of the genus in 2010, species now in Raorchestes had been assigned to genera Ixalus (no longer recognized), Philautus, and Pseudophilautus.

The genus is named in honour of C. R. Narayan Rao in recognition of his contribution to Indian batrachology. The other root orchestes is based on an older genus name for frogs of the Philautus group, Orchestes Tschudi 1838. Extensive exploration in the range of the genus in the Western Ghats of India suggests an under-estimation of the number of species in the genus. A study of the diverse species of the genus show that the separate isolated massifs of the Western Ghats played a major role in the speciation and habitat specificity seen in the genus of bush frogs.

Description

Raorchestes are largely nocturnal, relatively small frogs with adult body size  in snout-vent length. They lack vomerine teeth. Males have a large transparent vocal sac while calling. All described species of Raorchestes thus far, show direct development, that is, their life cycle does not involve a free-swimming tadpole stage. Their eggs hatch-out froglets skipping the tadpole stage making them less dependent on water. Raorchestes tinniens eggs took 36 days to hatch and temperature played a huge role in the development times. Different individuals of a species within this genus can be difficult to identify in the field because of color and pattern variations. Species of the genus Raorchestes also have different variations in their iris and pupil coloration. Difficulties in field identifications are leading to more integrative species description practices within the genus. These difficulties have also led to potential misidentification of species and ranges.

Frogs of the genus Raorchestes are known as bush frogs, and are known to use different arboreal niches. The exception being the short-limbed Raorchestes resplendens that is known to be ground-dwelling and was discovered on the highest peak of the Western Ghats called Anamudi.

Distribution 
One group is found in the mountain ranges of southern India (in the Western and Eastern Ghats) and another group ranges from northeastern India to Nepal, Myanmar, Thailand, and Laos to southern China and Vietnam and Peninsular Malaysia. They are most diverse in the Western Ghats of India; in contrast, only eight species from the genus have been reported from southeast Asia and China.

Conservation 
IUCN has assessed 38 species of Raorchestes. Many species are Critically Endangered, and one species (Raorchestes travancoricus) was already considered extinct, only to be rediscovered in 2004. Of the 38, eight are data deficient and 23 are in the critically endangered, endangered, and vulnerable categories. The Amphibian Specialist Group's list of "lost frogs" (frogs not seen for decades) includes 10 Raorchestes species. Since several species of the genus have been described in the last 15 years conservation data is relatively poor as are detailed life-history studies. Several species of the genus are known to have very narrow distribution ranges and are tied to specific niches in the environment which makes it difficult to have blanket conservation policy for the genus.

Several species of Raorchestes have been reported in checklists generated from both protected areas, as well as, agro and plantation landscapes.

Species
Many new species from India have been described since 2000. The following species are currently recognised in the genus Raorchestes:.

References

 
Rhacophoridae
Amphibians of Asia
Taxa named by Sathyabhama Das Biju
Amphibian genera